Pi Chamaeleontis, its name Latinized from π Chamaeleontis, is a binary star system located in the southern circumpolar constellation of Chamaeleon. It is dimly visible to the naked eye with an apparent visual magnitude of 5.64. It is drifting closer with a radial velocity of −10 km/s.

The Hipparcos satellite mission derived a  orbit on the basis of its motion caused by an unseen companion. It is roughly 1.8 billion years old.

References

F-type giants
Binary stars
Chamaeleon (constellation)
Chamaeleontis, Pi
Durchmusterung objects
101132
056675
4479